Damir Bartulovič (born 22 February 1996) is a Slovenian football player. He plays for Folgore Caratese.

Club career
He made his Serie B debut for Vicenza on 28 October 2014 in a game against Modena.

On 29 July 2019, he joined Serie D club Folgore Caratese.

References

External links
 

1996 births
Sportspeople from Koper
Living people
Slovenian footballers
Slovenia youth international footballers
Association football forwards
L.R. Vicenza players
Como 1907 players
NK Aluminij players
Mosta F.C. players
Serie B players
Serie C players
Slovenian PrvaLiga players
Maltese Premier League players
Slovenian expatriate footballers
Expatriate footballers in Italy
Expatriate footballers in Malta
Albissola 2010 players